Bennett McVey Stewart (August 6, 1912 – April 26, 1988) was an American politician who as a part of the Democratic party served as a U.S. Representative from Illinois from January 3, 1979 until January 3, 1981.

Biography

Early life and education
Stewart was born in Huntsville, Alabama to Bennett Stewart Sr. and Cathleen Jones. Stewart was baptized at Meridianville P.B. Church. Stewart attended the public schools in Huntsville and Birmingham. Stewart received a B.A. from Miles College in Birmingham in 1936. Thereafter, Stewart worked as the assistant principal of Irondale High School in 1936.

Career
Two years after serving as assistant principal of Irondale, Stewart became an associate professor of sociology at Miles College in 1938. Stewart worked as an insurance executive in 1940, and as the Illinois director for Atlanta Life Insurance Co. in 1950. Stewart and his family relocated to Chicago, Illinois in 1951 due to the insurance company Chicago branch opening. After seventeen years with Atlanta Life Insurance Co., Stewart began work  as an inspector of the Chicago Building Department in 1968. Stewart was a rehabilitation specialist for the Chicago Department of Urban Renewal in 1968.

Political career
Stewart was elected to the Chicago City Council as 21st Ward alderman in 1971, and was elected Democratic ward committeeman of the 21st Ward in 1972. He was reelected alderman in 1975 and reelected as ward committeeman in 1976. He was a delegate to the Illinois State Democratic conventions from 1971 to 1978. He was a delegate to the Democratic National Conventions in 1972 and 1976. Stewart was elected as a Democrat to the 96th Congress. He failed in his bid for renomination in 1980; Harold Washington, the primary's winner, also won in the general election. Stewart then served as administrative assistant to Mayor Jane Byrne in Chicago from 1981 to 1983.

Other, death and personal life
Stewart was a member of Alpha Phi Alpha fraternity. Stewart died on April 26, 1988, aged 75 at University of Chicago Hospital. Stewart funeral services was held at St. Paul Christian Methodist Episcopal Church in Chicago on April 30, 1988. At the time of his death, Stewart was survived by his wife since 1938, Pattye Crittenden. Together Stewart and Crittenden had two sons, Bennett Jr., and Ronald, a daughter, Miriam Stewart Early.

Electoral history

See also
List of African-American United States representatives

References

1912 births
1988 deaths
African-American members of the United States House of Representatives
African-American people in Illinois politics
Chicago City Council members
Politicians from Huntsville, Alabama
Miles College alumni
Democratic Party members of the United States House of Representatives from Illinois
20th-century American politicians
20th-century African-American politicians